No. 1 (Coastal) Operational Training Unit RAF was a training unit operated by the Royal Air Force Coastal Command. The unit was established during April 1940 by the renaming of a Coastal Command unit and disbanded during October 1943.

History

The unit originally started out life as the RAF Coastal Command Landplane Pilots Pool based at RAF Silloth in Cumbria training crews for landplanes flying Avro Ansons, Lockheed Hudsons, Bristol Blenheims and Bristol Beauforts. However, during April 1940 the unit was renamed to No. 1 (Coastal) Operational Training Unit and before long with the creation of more OTU's the unit started to specialise in training Hudson crews.

On 23 March 1943 the unit moved to RAF Thornaby before disbanding during October 1943.

Airfields used
 RAF Silloth as RAF Coastal Command Group from November 1939 and No. 1 (Coastal) OTU from April 1940.
 RAF Thornaby from 23 March 1943 until October 1943.

Accidents
During September 1942 a Lockheed Hudson Mk.I N7325 of the unit crashed on Cross Fell in the Peak District.

See also
 List of conversion units of the Royal Air Force

References

Citations

Bibliography

External links

Operational training units of the Royal Air Force